Panitema (পানীটেমা) is a village in Kamrup, situated in north bank of river Brahmaputra .

Transport
Pubborka is accessible through National Highway 31. All major private commercial vehicles ply between Panitema and nearby towns.

See also
 Panikhaiti
 Paneri

References

Villages in Kamrup district